"El Ritmo No Perdona 'Prende'" (English: The Rhythm Does Not Forgive "Turn It On") is a song by Daddy Yankee from his studio album Daddy Yankee Mundial released on July 1, 2009. On Daddy Yankee's official website the song was free, and included the music video for mobile phones. The song was released as an iTunes bonus track for the album.

Music video
 
The music video for "El Ritmo No Perdona (Prende)" was filmed entirely with the best video quality available in the suburb of Soho in New York City  with over 100 extras and produced and directed by Georgie Rivera and Louanson Alers. The video features many female dancers in a club dancing.

The sticky issue is a song involving the tropical essence of various people from different nations and infected with the rhythm of the song and what is happening in the place. The music video shows a battle between characters from both versions of DY, while rhythms of Reggaeton collide with those of Urban Merengue (also known as mambo de calle), song and music video were released the same day.

Remix
Despite many rumors to rivality, Don Omar confirmed on his Twitter account to be recorded a remix version of "El Ritmo No Perdona" with Yankee. The remix was planned to be included as bonus track on Daddy Yankee Mundial, but in the end was not included.

Formats and track listings
Digital download
"El Ritmo No Perdona (Prende)" (Album Version) - 3:03

Charts

References

External links
 DaddyYankee.com
 El Ritmo No Perdona (Prende) (music video) at YouTube

2009 singles
Daddy Yankee songs
Songs written by Daddy Yankee
2009 songs